Sphingomonas gimensis  is a Gram-negative and rod-shaped bacteria from the genus of Sphingomonas which has been isolated from a lead and zinc mine in Meizhou in the Guangdong Province in China.

References

Further reading

External links
Type strain of Sphingomonas gimensis at BacDive -  the Bacterial Diversity Metadatabase

gimensis
Bacteria described in 2014